The Purcari wine region (also called Nistreană)  is a Moldovan wine region. The southeastern Purcari zone stretches along the Western Dniester coast. Here is the Purcari winemaking center is situated, made famous by its red wines: Roșu de Purcari and Negru de Purcari. The climatic conditions are favorable to the cultivation of red grape varieties: Chardonnay, Sauvignon blanc, Cabernet Sauvignon, Merlot, Pinot noir, Malbec, Rara Neagră and Saperavi, which serve as the basis for the production of aged wines.

References

External links
www.vinmoldova.md - Basic Moldovan zones for growing grapes

Wine regions of Moldova